St Mary's is a 12th- or 13th-century English re-used church building, during its religious lifetime dedicated to St Mary, in the London suburb of Perivale. It was the smallest of Anglican churches in the dissolved county of Middlesex, excluding the City of London. It became separated from almost all of its parish's population by the development and heavy traffic on the A40 trunk road so that the parish was dissolved and church disbanded in 1972. It was adopted by a charitable organisation formed from the local community, the Friends of St Mary, and it functions as an arts centre, holding local exhibitions and performances of classical music.

The church is built of rag-stone and flint, and its tower is unusual, being clad in white weatherboarding. It contains a chime of three bells, all cast in 1949 as a World War II memorial for the war dead of the community and small parish as a whole.

The church was Grade I listed in 1950.

See also
Elthorne Hundred: its parishes map showing the extent of Perivale before it was redistributed among similar old and more modern parishes.

References

External links

 Web site for the church

Perivale
Perivale
Former Church of England church buildings
Perivale
Grade I listed buildings in the London Borough of Ealing
Grade I listed churches in London